This article lists events relating to rail transport that occurred during the 1760s.

1763

Births

December births
 December 28 – John Molson, established the Champlain and Saint Lawrence Railroad, the first railway into Canada (died 1836).

1765

Births

Unknown date births
 Matthew Murray, English steam engine manufacturer (died 1826).

1767

Events
The first ever cast iron rails are laid at Coalbrookdale.
Kambarka Engineering Works, now recognised for its rolling stock and locomotives, opens in current-day Urmdurt, Russia.
Plans are drawn up for the construction of a canal between Witton Park and Stockton-on-Tees which instead becomes the route of the Stockton and Darlington Railway

Births

May births
 May 31 – Edward Pease, first owner of the Stockton and Darlington Railway (died 1858).

See also
 Years in rail transport

References